
Gmina Bielsk is a rural gmina (administrative district) in Płock County, Masovian Voivodeship, in east-central Poland.

Villages
Gmina Bielsk contains the villages and settlements of Bielsk, Bolechowice, Cekanowo, Ciachcin, Ciachcin Nowy, Dębsk, Drwały, Dziedzice, Gilino, Giżyno, Goślice, Jączewo, Jaroszewo Biskupie, Jaroszewo-Wieś, Józinek, Kędzierzyn, Kleniewo, Kłobie, Konary, Kuchary-Jeżewo, Leszczyn Księży, Leszczyn Szlachecki, Lubiejewo, Machcinko, Machcino, Niszczyce, Niszczyce-Pieńki, Pęszyno, Rudowo, Sękowo, Śmiłowo, Smolino, Strusino, Szewce, Tchórz, Tłubice, Ułtowo, Umienino, Zągoty, Zagroba, Zakrzewo and Żukowo.

Neighbouring gminas
Gmina Bielsk is bordered by the gminas of Drobin, Gozdowo, Radzanowo, Stara Biała, Staroźreby and Zawidz.

References
Polish official population figures 2006

Bielsk
Płock County